Victor Serrano (1944 – 27 April 2022) was a French rugby league player. He played as prop, second-row and lock. He is often nicknamed "Nestor".

Biography

During his childhood, he played for the football Miramont-de-Comminges club since age ten, before joining the Saint-Gaudens rugby league club, next to his residence site.

Serrano played for Saint-Gaudens at club level. He also represented France between 1968 and 1975, playing the 1968, 1972 and 1975 Rugby League World Cups. Outside the game, he worked as an electrician.

Honours
Rugby league:
French Championship:
 2 times Champion in: 1969, 1973, (Saint-Gaudens)
 5 times finalist in 1965, 1966, 1968, 1970, 1971 (Saint-Gaudens)

References

External links
Victor Serrano at projectrugbyleague.com

1944 births
2022 deaths
France national rugby league team players
French rugby league players
Rugby league locks
Rugby league props
Rugby league second-rows
Saint-Gaudens Bears players
Spanish emigrants to France
Sportspeople from the Province of Valencia
People from Safor
Sportspeople from Haute-Garonne